Kuwanak Island is an island in Papua New Guinea, part of the Calvados Chain within the Louisiade Archipelago. 
Its only settlement is called Abagagaheia, and it is located on the northwestern point. At low tide you can walk to Taifaur.

References

Islands of Milne Bay Province
Louisiade Archipelago